Lionel Frederick Lightborn 'Leo' Oakley (24 January 1926 - November ) was an English rugby union footballer.  Educated at Bedford School, he gained one cap for England in 1951, during the 1951 Home Nations Championship, as a centre, in Swansea, against Wales.

References 

 http://www.espnscrum.com/england/rugby/player/5357.html

1926 births
1981 deaths
People educated at Bedford School
English rugby union players
England international rugby union players
East Midlands RFU players